The Coombe Women & Infants University Hospital is a voluntary teaching hospital providing a range of medical services to both women and newborn infants in Dublin, Ireland. It is managed by Dublin Midlands Hospital Group.

History
The hospital was founded by Margaret Boyle in the vacated building of the Meath Hospital in the Coombe in Dublin's Liberties area in 1826. It formally opened as the Coombe Lying-in Hospital in 1829 and was granted a Royal Charter in 1867.

The hospital moved to modern premises nearby in Dolphin's Barn in 1967. Although the old hospital was demolished, the portico was retained as a monument to the many mothers who gave birth in the old hospital. The new facility was renamed the Coombe Women's Hospital in 1993 and it was renamed the Coombe Women & Infants University Hospital in January 2008.

The hospital was targeted in a ransomware attack on 15 December 2021 forcing its IT services to be shut down.

Services
The Coombe Women & Infants University Hospital is one of the largest providers of women and infant health care in the Republic of Ireland. Over 8,000 mothers give birth in the hospital every year. It provides clinical experience to three training colleges, including University College Dublin, Royal College of Surgeons in Ireland and Trinity College, Dublin.

References

External links
 

Teaching hospitals in Dublin (city)
Hospital buildings completed in 1967
Teaching hospitals of the Royal College of Surgeons in Ireland
Teaching hospitals of the University of Dublin, Trinity College
1826 establishments in Ireland
Hospitals established in 1826
Health Service Executive hospitals